American singer Hilary Duff has recorded and released a total of 96 songs.

Songs

Unreleased songs

References 

General
 

Specific

External links
 Hilary Duff discography on AllMusic

 
Duff, Hilary